, also romanized as Ō-an, was a Japanese era name (年号, nengō, lit. year name) of the Northern Court during the Era of Northern and Southern Courts after Jōji and before Eiwa. This period spanned the years from February 1368 through February 1375.

Nanboku-chō overview

During the Meiji period, an Imperial decree dated March 3, 1911 established that the legitimate reigning monarchs of this period were the direct descendants of Emperor Go-Daigo through Emperor Go-Murakami, whose  had been established in exile in Yoshino, near Nara.

Until the end of the Edo period, the militarily superior pretender-Emperors supported by the Ashikaga shogunate had been mistakenly incorporated in Imperial chronologies despite the undisputed fact that the Imperial Regalia were not in their possession.

This illegitimate  had been established in Kyoto by Ashikaga Takauji.

Change of era
 1368, also called : The new era name was created to mark an event or series of events. The previous era ended and the new one commenced in Jōji 7.

In this time frame, Shōhei (1346–1370), Kentoku (1370–1372) and Bunchū (1372–1375) were Southern Court equivalent nengō.

Events of the Ōan era 
 1368 (Ōan 1): The Southern Court proclaims Emperor Chōkei's succession to the vacancy created by the death of Emperor Go-Murakami.
 1369 (Ōan 2): Kusunoki Masanori defects to Ashikaga.
 1370 (Ōan 3): Imagawa Sadayo sent to subdue Kyūshū.
 1371 (Ōan 4): Attempts to arrange truce.
 1373-1406 (Ōan 6 – Ōei 13): Embassies between China and Japan.
 1374 (Ōan 7): En'yū ascends northern throne.

Notes

References
 Ackroyd, Joyce. (1982) Lessons from History: The Tokushi Yoron. Brisbane: University of Queensland Press. 
 Mehl, Margaret. (1997). History and the State in Nineteenth-Century Japan. New York: St Martin's Press. ; OCLC 419870136
 Nussbaum, Louis Frédéric and Käthe Roth. (2005). Japan Encyclopedia. Cambridge: Harvard University Press. ; OCLC 48943301
 Thomas, Julia Adeney. (2001). Reconfiguring Modernity: Concepts of Nature in Japanese Political Ideology. Berkeley: University of California Press. ; 
 Titsingh, Isaac. (1834). Nihon Odai Ichiran; ou,  Annales des empereurs du Japon.  Paris: Royal Asiatic Society, Oriental Translation Fund of Great Britain and Ireland. OCLC 5850691

External links
 National Diet Library, "The Japanese Calendar" -- historical overview plus illustrative images from library's collection

Japanese eras
1360s in Japan
1370s in Japan